East Timor participated in the 2010 Asian Games in Guangzhou from 12 November to 27 November 2010. They will participate in athletics, beach volleyball, boxing, cycling, karate, taekwondo, table tennis, and weightlifting. The contingent comprises 29 athletes, 21 men and 8 women.

Athletics

Beach Volleyball

Both men's and a women's teams were sent.

Men

Women

Group B

|}

|}

Boxing

Cycling

Karate

Table Tennis

Taekwondo

Weightlifting

References 

Nations at the 2010 Asian Games
2010
Asian Games